Khaki (also Romanized as Khākī) is a village in Sharabian Rural District of Mehraban District, Sarab County, East Azerbaijan province, Iran. At the 2006 National Census, its population was 1,355 in 366 households. The following census in 2011 counted 1,434 people in 438 households. The latest census in 2016 showed a population of 1,465 people in 456 households; it was the largest village in its rural district.

References 

Sarab County

Populated places in East Azerbaijan Province

Populated places in Sarab County